= De 7 straatjes =

Neighbourhood in Arnhem, Netherlands

Coordinates: 51°58′51.3″N 5°54′30.8″E

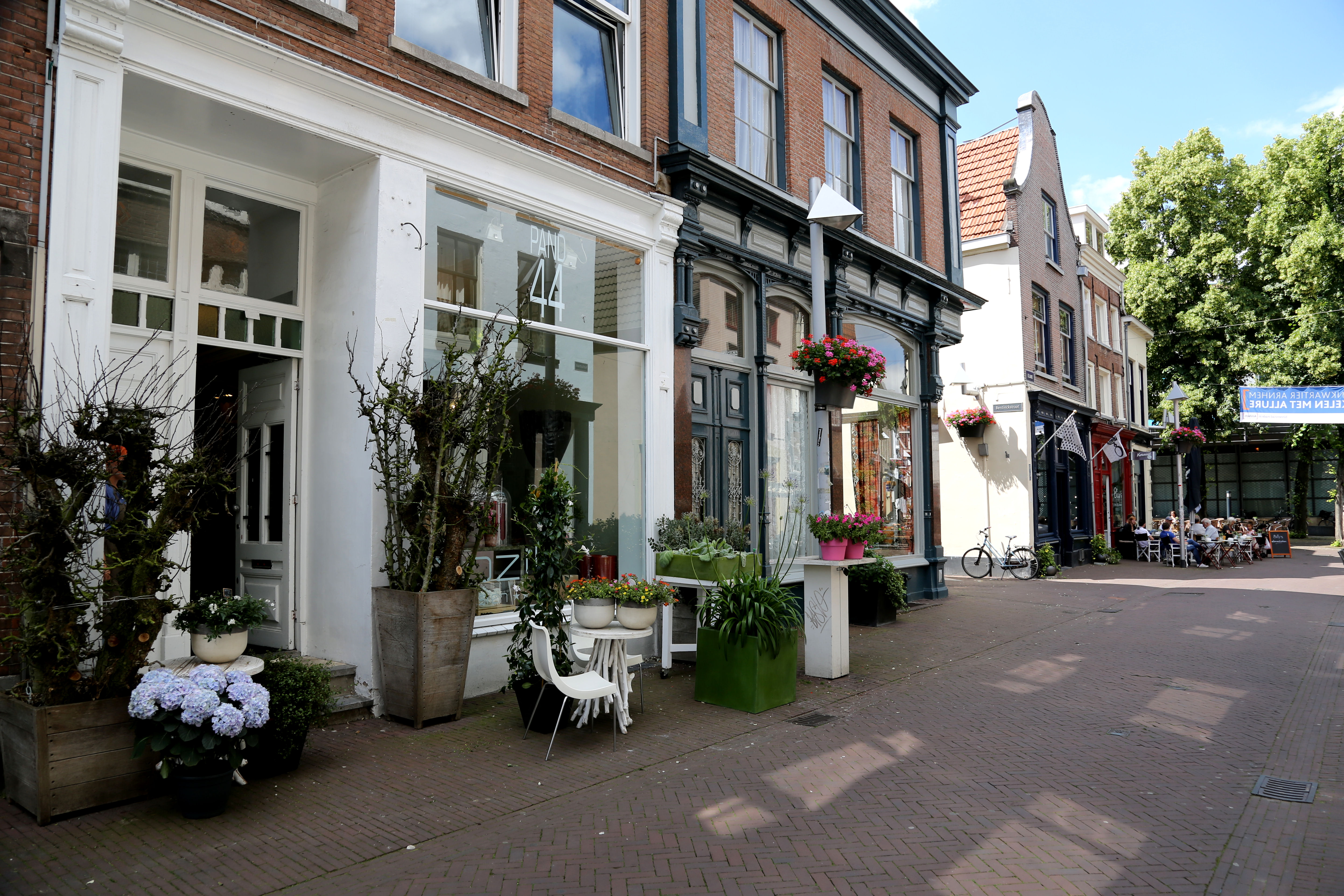
7straatjes Arnhem, June 2014

De 7straatjes (Dutch for "the 7 little streets") is a neighbourhood in the historical centre of Arnhem, in the Netherlands. The alternative name is the Stegenkwartier.

The neighbourhood is famous for its small cafes, wine bars, restaurants and the diverse design and art shops. It consists of the following streets: Arke Noachstraat, Bentinckstraat, Eiland, Kerkstraat, Pastoorstraat, Wielakkerstraat and Zwanenstraat. Since 2014, the residents and business owners in the 7straatjes have formed an association to work together in promoting and caring for the neighbourhood.

De 7straatjes takes its name after the infamous 9 straatjes in Amsterdam, the Netherlands.
